The Museo Bellapart is a private art museum in Santo Domingo, Dominican Republic. Its collection includes artwork from the mid-19th century to the 1960s.

See also

 List of art museums

References

External links
 Museo Bellapart website 

Museums with year of establishment missing
Art museums and galleries in the Dominican Republic
Buildings and structures in Santo Domingo
Tourist attractions in Santo Domingo